Roxochampsa is an extinct genus of crocodylomorph from the Late Cretaceous of Brazil belonging to the sebecosuchian clade Itasuchidae. The type species is R. paulistanus.

Discovery and naming 
 
Roxochampsa was originally described as a new species of Goniopholis, G. paulistanus, in 1936, based on two teeth (DGM 259-R and DGM 258-R) and a tibia (DGM 225-R), all from the Adamantina Formation of São Paulo state, Brazil. However, Andrade et al. (2011) rejected referral of the species of Goniopholis and treated it as a nomen dubium referable to Neosuchia indeterminate. Pinheiro et al. (2018) described new jaw material from the Presidente Prudente Formation of the Alfredo Marcondes municipality in São Paulo state, and noted that the tooth crowns in the jaw material morphologically matched the teeth in the syntype series of G. paulistanus. They erected Roxochampsa for the species, designating DGM 259-R and DGM 258-R as the lectotype and paralectotype respectively, while assigning the tibia (collected at a different locality than the teeth) to Sebecosuchia indeterminate.

References 

Late Cretaceous crocodylomorphs of South America
Maastrichtian life
Cretaceous Brazil
Fossils of Brazil
Adamantina Formation
Paraná Basin
Fossil taxa described in 1936
Prehistoric pseudosuchian genera